West Norfolk or Norfolk Western (formally the "Western division of Norfolk") was a county constituency in the county of Norfolk, which returned two Members of Parliament (MPs) to the House of Commons of the Parliament of the United Kingdom, elected by the bloc vote system.

The constituency was created by the Reform Act 1832 for the 1832 general election, alongside Eastern Norfolk, as one of two Divisions of the Parliamentary County of Norfolk, each returning 2 MPs. It was abolished under the Redistribution of Seats Act 1885 for the 1885 general election.

Boundaries and boundary changes
1832–1868: The Hundreds of Freebridge Marshland, Smithdon, Freebridge Lynn, Clackclose, Brothercross, Gallow, Holt, Launditch, South Greenhoe, Grimshoe, North Greenhoe, Wayland, Shropham, Gilt Cross and Mitford.

1868–1885: The Hundreds of Wayland, Launditch, South Greenhoe, Gallow, Brothercross, Smithdon, Freebridge Lynn, Freebridge Marshland, Clackclose and Grimshoe.

Small parts of the division were transferred to the newly formed North and South Divisions of Norfolk. Also absorbed the disenfranchised Parliamentary Borough of Thetford.

On abolition in 1885, northern areas formed the new North-Western Division of Norfolk, southern areas formed the new South-Western Division and central areas were included in the new Mid Division.

Members of Parliament

Election results

Elections in the 1830s

Elections in the 1840s

 
 11776

Elections in the 1850s

Elections in the 1860s

Elections in the 1870s
Grey succeeded to the peerage, becoming Lord Walsingham.

Elections in the 1880s
Bagge's death caused a by-election.

Bentinck's resignation caused a by-election.

References 

Parliamentary constituencies in Norfolk (historic)
Constituencies of the Parliament of the United Kingdom established in 1832
Constituencies of the Parliament of the United Kingdom disestablished in 1885